Tony Miles (born May 16, 1978) is a Canadian Football League wide receiver/punt returner who is currently a free agent.

College career
Miles attended Northwest Missouri State University. As a freshman, he was an All-MIAA first team selection at wide receiver, and a second team All-MIAA selection at running back. As a senior, he was a first team All-MIAA selection at both, wide receiver and kick returner. As a senior, he was an NCAA Division II All-American, a first team All-MIAA selection at both, wide receiver and kick returner, the MIAA offensive MVP, and one of five players from the NCAA Division II level selected to play in the Hula Bowl. He left school as the all-time career leader in receiving yards (3,079 yards), receiving touchdowns (30 TDs), punt return yardage (1,302 yards), and punts returned for touchdowns (three touchdowns).

Canadian Football League career
Miles began his CFL career with the Tiger-Cats in 2002, but was traded to the Toronto Argonauts in 2003 along with fullback Randy Bowles for defensive end Joe Montford.  It was with the Argonauts that Miles won a Grey Cup championship in 2004.  On February 16, 2008, Miles re-signed with the Tiger-Cats as a free agent.

External links
Profile on Toronto Argonauts' roster page

1978 births
Living people
American football return specialists
American football running backs
American football wide receivers
American players of Canadian football
Canadian football return specialists
Canadian football wide receivers
Hamilton Tiger-Cats players
Northwest Missouri State Bearcats football players
Northwest Missouri State University alumni
People from Mart, Texas
Toronto Argonauts players